
Gmina Krosno Odrzańskie is an urban-rural gmina (administrative district) in Krosno Odrzańskie County, Lubusz Voivodeship, in western Poland.

The gmina contains part of the protected area called Gryżyna Landscape Park.

Villages
Apart from the town of Krosno Odrzańskie, Gmina Krosno Odrzańskie contains the villages and settlements of Bielów, Brzózka, Chojna, Chyże, Czarnowo, Czetowice, Gostchorze, Kamień, Łochowice, Marcinowice, Morsko, Nowy Raduszec, Osiecznica, Radnica, Retno, Sarbia, Sarnie Łęgi, Stary Raduszec, Strumienno, Szklarka Radnicka and Wężyska.

Neighbouring gminas
Gmina Krosno Odrzańskie is bordered by the gminas of Bobrowice, Bytnica, Czerwieńsk, Dąbie, Gubin and Maszewo.

Twin towns – sister cities

Gmina Krosno Odrzańskie is twinned with:
 Bremervörde, Germany
 Karcag, Hungary
 Schwarzheide, Germany

References

Krosno Odrzanskie
Krosno Odrzańskie County